Nicanor was one of the Seven Deacons. He was martyred in 76. He is one of the 4 out of 7 deacons of the Seventy collectively feasted on July 28.

References

76 deaths
1st-century Christian martyrs
Cypriot Jews
Early Jewish Christians
Seventy disciples
Saints from the Holy Land
Christian saints from the New Testament
Year of birth unknown